Grazyna Bluff is a rock bluff rising to about  in the south part of Turks Head Ridge, Ross Island. At the suggestion of P.R. Kyle it was named by the Advisory Committee on Antarctic Names (2000) after Grazyna Zreda-Gostynska, who worked on Mount Erebus in 1989–90 as a member of the New Mexico Institute of Mining and Technology (NMIMT) team. A Ph.D. student at NMIMT, she completed her doctoral dissertation on the gas emissions from Mount Erebus.

References

Cliffs of Ross Island